The TCA Award for Outstanding Achievement in Sketch/Variety Shows is an award given by the Television Critics Association. The category was introduced in 2018, diverging from the Outstanding Achievement in News and Information category to honor variety talk and sketch shows.

Winners and nominees

Programs with multiple wins

3 wins
 Last Week Tonight with John Oliver

Multiple nominees

5 nominations
 Last Week Tonight with John Oliver
 Late Night with Seth Meyers

4 nominations
 The Late Show with Stephen Colbert
 Saturday Night Live

3 nominations
 A Black Lady Sketch Show
 Full Frontal with Samantha Bee

2 nominations
 The Amber Ruffin Show
 The Daily Show with Trevor Noah
 Desus & Mero
 I Think You Should Leave with Tim Robinson
 Ziwe

Total awards by network

 HBO – 4
Netflix — 1

References

External links
 Official website

Variety